Nordman is a Swedish musical group.

Nordman may also refer to:

 Nordman (surname)
 Nordman, Idaho, unincorporated community in Bonner County, Idaho

See also
 Nordmann, a surname
 Nordman, a brand of cold-weather boots
 Nordmann fir